Lina Tsaldari (1887 – 17 October 1981) was a right-wing Greek politician.  She became the first female minister in Greece in 1956, serving as the Minister for Social Welfare under Konstantinos Karamanlis' government.

Early life
Tsaldari was born Lina Lambrou in 1887 to Spyridon Lambros (b. 1851 - d. 1919), who succeeded Nikolaos Kalogeropoulos as Prime Minister of Greece, serving from October 1916 to February 1917. Tsaldari was of Aromanian descent, just like her father.

Political career
Tsaldari became the first woman to serve in the Government of Greece, serving as the Minister of Social Welfare. She was also an active suffragist. After serving in Parliament, she became Permanent Representative of Greece to the United Nations.

Personal life
Tsaldari married Panagis Tsaldaris (b. 1868 – d. 1936) in 1919, the same year that her father died in Skopelos. Like her father, Tsaldaris served as Prime Minister of Greece.

Death
Tsaldari died of a stroke on 17 October 1981. She was 94 years old.

References 

1887 births
1981 deaths
Politicians from Athens
National Radical Union politicians
Women government ministers of Greece
Social affairs ministers
Health ministers of Greece
Greek MPs 1956–1958
Permanent Representatives of Greece to the United Nations
Greek suffragists
20th-century Greek women politicians
Greek women diplomats
Greek women ambassadors
Greek people of Aromanian descent
Diplomats from Athens